David Schwarz may refer to:

 David M. Schwarz, American New Classical architect
 David Schwarz (aviation inventor) (1852–1897), Hungarian aviation pioneer
 David Schwarz (footballer) (born 1972), Australian rules footballer

See also 
 David Schwartz (disambiguation)
 Schwarz (disambiguation)